The  is a private railroad company in Japan, and a subsidiary of the Meitetsu Group. The company operates the Atsumi Line train service on Atsumi Peninsula in Aichi Prefecture and a tram system in Toyohashi City, and has subsidiary operations involved in taxi and bus services.

Company history
The company expanded into bus services from 1935. From September 1939, the company came under the umbrella of the Nagoya Railway (the forerunner to modern Meitetsu). The company established a subsidiary for taxicab operations on September 1, 1949. The company name was officially changed to its current name on July 22, 1954. On October 1, 1954, Meitetsu turned over operations and assets from its Atsumi Line to the new Toyohashi Railway Corporation.

On October 1, 1956, the Toyohashi Railway acquired the local Taguchi Railway Company, which continued to operate as the Toyohashi Railway Taguchi Line until September 1, 1968. In October, 1988 the company opened a hotel at Toyohashi Station.

From February 2011, the Manaca Smart Card system was implemented on the Toyohashi Railway network.

Railway Lines
Heavy rail
Atsumi Line: –
Tramway
Azumada Main Line: –, –

Bus Lines
Toyotetsu Bus operates local lines in and around Toyohashi, as well as the highway bus linking the city and Chūbu Centrair International Airport, the night bus linking the city and Tokyo.

See also
List of railway companies in Japan
List of light-rail transit systems

External links 

  Official website
 

Meitetsu Group
Railway companies established in 1924
Articles containing video clips